Kimweri ye Nyumbai (or Shekulwavu) (died 1862) was the King of the Shambaa people of the Usambara Mountains in what is now Tanga Region of Tanzania between around 1815 and 1862. Under his rule the kingdom reached its greatest extent. However, disruptions caused by the introduction of firearms and the slave trade caused the kingdom to fall apart after his death.

Background
Kimweri ye Nyumbai belonged to the Kilindi dynasty, founded by Mbegha.
According to legend, Mbegha was a hunter who came from far away to live in the Usambara rain forest, where he killed wild pigs for food.
The Shambaa were impressed by his prowess and accepted him as ruler of the town of Vuga, their capital in the western Usambara mountains.
The Kilindi rulers took the title "Simbe Mwene", the Lion King.
Mbegha was succeeded by his son Bughe, who was succeeded by his son Kinyashe, Kimweri's father.
Kinyashi strengthened the kingdom's political and military organisation in response to raids from slavers and cattle raiders. 
He gained control of the Wazigua country to the south in the lower Pangani River valley, and of the eastern Usambara mountains, nearer to the coast.

The expanding East African slave trade in the 19th century was controlled by the Omani Arabs, whose sultan had moved his capital to the island of Zanzibar. 
The route from the port of Pangani at the mouth of the Pangani River to the Usambara Mountains and Mount Kilimanjaro was one of the most important of the trade routes across Tanganyika, along which slaves and ivory were brought to the coast in exchange for cotton cloth and guns. 
Kimweri ye Nyumbai was the Kilindi leader at a time when his people were taking control of the trade on behalf of the Arabs.

Reign

Kingdom
The Shambaa kingdom reached its greatest strength during the reign of Kimweri ye Nyumbani.
He expanded the kingdom, and by 1835 controlled all of the coastline below the Usambaras.
He ruled from the hilltop town of Vuga over an area southeast of Mount Kilimanjaro that contained about 500,000 people.
His realm stretched from the mountains to the coastal region between Tanga and Pangani, and into the plains to the south and east.
An 1853 report said of the island settlements in the Pangani River that "the Wasegua [Zigula] have settled here [on these islands] in this fruitful region by the permission of Chief Kimweri".

Kimweri was said to have 300 wives, and the capital was surrounded by villages holding his wives and dependents.
He had a great many children, and installed them in place of most of the local chiefs. As a result, the kingdom was relatively peaceful, with Kimweri ultimately able to overrule unjust decisions by his sons. However, after his death the effect was that the king faced challenges from his brothers.

Tribute and trade

Kimweri ye Nyumbai was visited by the missionary Johann Ludwig Krapf in 1848 and again in 1852.
Krapf said he was hospitable to strangers, and was an effective ruler.
In 1852 Krapf saw Kimweri's collectors extracting tribute from the loosely controlled coastal region, then taking them back to Vugha where the spoils were divided. Of 200 pieces of cloth, considered to be wealth equivalent to livestock, Kimweri ye Nyumbai took 100 cloths, the collectors took 42, and non-Kilindi officials divided up the remainder. It was in their interest for Kimweri to be strong enough to obtain tribute.

Krapf said that the governor of Pangani paid  of Lowell sheeting to Kimweri as tribute. This was cotton cloth from the Lowell Mills of the United States, which could be adapted as clothing, used for sails or for funeral winding sheets.
Beads, cloth, knives, brass wire and other items imported from the coast became a form of currency.

The people in the newly subjected eastern part of the kingdom were subject to harsher rule than in the west. 
The local chiefs were more likely to enslave their people and seize their property. 
Rebellion against Kilindi control or failure to pay tribute were common.
Witches, rebels and prisoners of war could be sold to coastal traders, usually in exchange for arms and ammunition. 
Later in his reign Kimweri ye Nyumbai's decreed that major thieves could also be sold.
Johann Jakob Erhardt, who visited Vugha in September 1853, saw two witches brought in and executed. 
Their wealth and dependents were taken.

Conflict with neighbours

At first Kimweri, ruling an isolated and conservative state, did not appreciate the value of firearms.
They were unknown in the reign of his father.
In the 1830s the Zigula people obtained arms and used them to take control of the Pangani River valley.
Starting in the 1840s there was a dramatic rise in the number of flintlock muskets and gunpowder imported into the region,
and Kimweri was actively competing for these weapons with other local rulers.

The kingdom was attacked by Maasai raiders from the north, but they do not seem to have penetrated into the lower Pangani. Erhardt recorded the repulse of a Maasai raid in 1853 at Mazinde by an allied army of Shambaa under Semboja, Kimweri's son, and of Wazigua, Parakuyo and "Arabs" (most likely Swahili).
The growth of trade in ivory and slaves led to a conflict in 1853 with the Sultan of Zanzibar, Seyyid Said.
The two rulers reached an agreement under which they had a form of joint sovereignty over the coastal region, and Kimweri assumed the title of Sultan.

By the 1850s the caravans from the coast were avoiding the lower Pangani basin, which was unsafe due to Zigua raiders, and were taking a route to the north of the Usambaras. Sultan Seyyid Said had a profitable agreement with the Zigua by which they supplied large quantities of slaves, ivory and grain. Kimweri offered Mount Tongwe, in a strategic position in this area, to Krapf as the site for a mission station. Around 1853 Sultan Seyyid Said built a fort on Mount Tongwe. It has been speculated that Kimweri invited first Krapf and then Seyyid Said to occupy the site as a way of disrupting the better-armed Ziguas' "mythical center of power... from which the Zigua drew inspirations."

Last years
The explorers Richard Burton and John Hanning Speke visited Vuga in 1857, 
passing through local markets where villagers traded their produce.
Burton wrote: "The war-horn is now silent, and the watch-fire never leaves the mountain."
Burton described Kimweri,

Kimweri died a few years later, in 1862.

Aftermath

After Kimweri ye Nyumbai died a civil war broke out over the succession, 
fueled by competition for the new wealth that the caravan trade in the Pangani valley had brought to the region.
Smallpox and slave trading contributed to the disintegration of the kingdom, and in 1898 a fire destroyed Vuga.
The Shambaa people played an important role in the Abushiri uprising in 1888–89, but finally yielded to the Germans in 1898.
Under colonial rule the dynasty continued to have some authority, but in 1962 the Tanzanian government removed all power from the hereditary chiefdoms.
Kimweri ye Nyumbai's descendant Kimweri Mputa Magogo (died 2000) was the last Lion King.

The burial sites of Kimwere's grandson, Kipondo, and granddaughter, Chonge, were treated as sacred sites as late as 1984. 
Ceremonies held at these sites may help overcome problems such as shortage of rain.
However, these beliefs are fading with the growing influence of Islam and Christianity.

In retrospect, the reign of Kimweri came to be seen as a golden age. It was said of him:

References
Notes

Citations

Sources

1862 deaths
Tanzanian chiefs
Year of birth missing
Tanga, Tanzania
Tanga